Lakhdar Bouyahi (born 21 January 1946) is an Algerian footballer. He played in seven matches for the Algeria national football team in 1967 and 1968. He was also named in Algeria's squad for the 1968 African Cup of Nations tournament.

References

External links
 

1946 births
Living people
Algerian footballers
Algeria international footballers
1968 African Cup of Nations players
Mediterranean Games competitors for Algeria
Competitors at the 1967 Mediterranean Games
Association football defenders
Footballers from Algiers
21st-century Algerian people